Summit Ridge is a ridge, 380 m, with a steep ice slope on the north side and a rock cliff on the south side. It extends eastward from Passes Peak for 0.5 nautical miles (0.9 km) and is located 2 nautical miles (3.7 km) south of the head of Hope Bay at the northeast end of Antarctic Peninsula. This area was first explored by the Swedish Antarctic Expedition, 1901–04. Summit Ridge was first charted and named by the Falkland Islands Dependencies Survey (FIDS), 1945. The feature takes its name from nearby Summit Pass.

References

Sources

Ridges of Graham Land
Landforms of Trinity Peninsula